Holy Trinity Church, Morecambe, or Morecambe Parish Church, is in Church Street, Morecambe, Lancashire, England. It is the Anglican parish church of Morecambe, in the deanery of Lancaster, the archdeaconry of Lancaster and the diocese of Blackburn. The church is recorded in the National Heritage List for England as a designated Grade II listed building.

History

The original church was built as a chapel of ease of St Mary's, Lancaster in 1745 on land bequeathed for the purpose in the will of Francis Bowes, the village blacksmith, who died in 1742.  This was before the creation of the town of Morecambe from three former villages; this building was in Poulton-le-Sands. By the early 1800s the chapel was too small for the growing population.  It was rebuilt in 1840–41 to a design by the Lancaster architect Edmund Sharpe.  The foundation stone was laid on 16 June 1840, and the new church was consecrated on 15 June 1841 by the Bishop of Chester.  The church cost £1,288 to build, and Queen Victoria made a personal contribution to this.  As originally built, the church seated 498 people.  A south aisle was added in 1866 by Sharpe's successor, E. G. Paley. In 1897 Austin and Paley, (further successors in the architectural practice), added a new chancel, an organ chamber, and vestries, and provided an additional 69 seats, at an estimated cost of £1,160. A Lady chapel was created in the southeast of the church in 1966.  In 1995 the church was re-ordered to celebrate 250 years since the foundation of the church.

Architecture

Exterior
The church is built in sandstone with a green slate roof. Its plan consists of a west tower, a nave with a south aisle and a north transept, and a chancel with its roof at a lower level. In the angle between the transept and the chancel is a vestry. The tower has three stages with corner buttresses. There is a west door with three lancet windows above it. On the west and south sides of the middle stage are clock faces. In the top stage are triple stepped lancet bell openings. The tower is surmounted by a parapet that rises to a triangular gable above each bell opening, and there are pinnacles at the corners. The north wall of the nave consists of six bays, separated by buttresses and containing lancet windows. The south wall has seven bays, also separated by buttresses; the windows have two lights, and over each window the parapet rises to a triangle. The east window has five lights.

Interior
Internally there is a seven-bay arcade carried on octagonal timber columns, and a west gallery containing the coat of arms of Queen Victoria. Stained glass in the chancel, and some of it elsewhere in the church, is by Shrigley and Hunt. Other glass is by Abbott and Company, and by the Loyne Ecclesiastical Studios. The Lady Chapel contains a Westmorland slate altar. In the vestry is a tablet from the original church commemorating Francis Bowes. In the south aisle is a memorial to the South African War dating from about 1904, composed of copper and brass repoussé work. There is a ring of eight bells: the original six were recast and augmented to eight in 1939 by John Taylor & Co.

See also

Listed buildings in Morecambe
List of architectural works by Edmund Sharpe
List of ecclesiastical works by E. G. Paley
List of ecclesiastical works by Austin and Paley (1895–1914)

References
Citations

Sources

Morecambe, Holy Trinity Church
Morecambe, Holy Trinity Church
Gothic Revival church buildings in England
Morecambe, Holy Trinity Church
Churches completed in 1841
Churches completed in 1866
Churches completed in 1897
19th-century Church of England church buildings
Morecambe, Holy Trinity Church
Morecambe, Holy Trinity Church
Morecambe, Holy Trinity Church
Morecambe, Holy Trinity Church
Morecambe, Holy Trinity Church
Buildings and structures in Morecambe
1841 establishments in England